Asiatic Society is a society founded by British in the Indian subcontinent in early 18th century with a view to encourage science, literature and the arts in relation to Asia. It could refer to any of the following: 

 The Asiatic Society located in Kolkata, India.
 Asiatic Society, Mumbai located in Mumbai, India.
 Asiatic Society of Japan located in Yokohama, Japan.
 Royal Asiatic Society of Great Britain and Ireland located in London, England.
 Asiatic Society of Bangladesh located in Dhaka, Bangladesh.
 Royal Asiatic Society Hong Kong Branch located in Hong Kong